4'-Fluoro-4-methylaminorex (4-FPO) is a recreational designer drug from the substituted aminorex family, with stimulant effects. It was first detected in Slovenia in 2018. It was made illegal in Italy in March 2020.

See also 

 2C-B-aminorex
 3-Fluorophenmetrazine
 4-Fluoroamphetamine
 4,4'-DMAR
 Fluminorex
 MDMAR
 List of aminorex analogues

References 

Designer drugs
Fluoroarenes
Oxazoles
Amines